Kyrylo Silich (born on 3 August 1990) is a Ukrainian professional footballer who plays as a midfielder.

History
Midfielder joined Lithuanian I Lyga side DFK Dainava on 9 March 2017. He played a total of 850 minutes in all 12 matches of the first 13 tours, assisting team forwards Sam Shaban and Lukas Baranauskas and helping the club to reach 1st place in the league table.

Silich moved to A Lyga club Jonava in the 2017 summer transfer window.

In 2019, Silich returned to DFK Dainava.

References

1990 births
Living people
Ukrainian footballers
Ukrainian expatriate footballers
Association football midfielders
FC Dnister Ovidiopol players
FC Knyazha-2 Shchaslyve players
FC Nyva Vinnytsia players
FC Obolon-Brovar Kyiv players
FC Desna Chernihiv players
JK Sillamäe Kalev players
FK Jelgava players
FK Dainava Alytus players
FK Jonava players
07 Vestur players
United Victory players
FC Chornomorets Odesa players
Meistriliiga players
Latvian Higher League players
A Lyga players
Ukrainian expatriate sportspeople in Estonia
Ukrainian expatriate sportspeople in Latvia
Ukrainian expatriate sportspeople in Lithuania
Ukrainian expatriate sportspeople in the Maldives
Expatriate footballers in Estonia
Expatriate footballers in Latvia
Expatriate footballers in Lithuania
Expatriate footballers in the Faroe Islands
Expatriate footballers in the Maldives
Footballers from Odesa